Alexander Sánchez Sepúlveda (born June 5, 1973) is a former Puerto Rican professional boxer. He held the WBO minimumweight title from 1993 to 1997.

Boxing career
Sánchez began his professional boxing career on October 4, 1991, knocking out Carlos Figueroa in round one at Mayagüez, Puerto Rico.

After one more win that year, he took 1992 off, but came back in 1993 to post nine wins in a row before facing Orlando Malone for the WBO's world Strawweight championship. On December 22 of that year, Sánchez became a world champion by knocking Malone out in the first round at San Juan, Puerto Rico.

He went on a European tour in 1994, retaining his title and winning a non-title bout in Spain, and retaining his title in Germany. By then, Sánchez was actively challenging Michael Carbajal into a fight. That fight, however, never came off.

In 1995, he retained his title twice, and won four non-title bouts. In 1996, he only had one fight, knocking out Jose Luis Velardez in round five.

In 1997, he started by suffering his first defeat, at the hands of Edgar Cardenas, by a decision in ten rounds. He then beat future world champion Victor Burgos by a decision in twelve to retain the title, in what marked the beginning of their trilogy of bouts. He closed the year by getting his long anticipated unification bout with WBC world champion Ricardo López, but he lost the title to López when López knocked him out in round five at Madison Square Garden.

Sánchez has been active only on and off since. In 2002, he and Burgos had their second meeting, and this time the result was a draw. But in 2003, after López had conquered the IBF world belt and retired, the IBF declared Sánchez and Burgos their official challengers for the world crown, and this time, Sánchez lost by a knockout in round 12 at Las Vegas.

Sánchez revealed that he had become a newborn Christian shortly before his next fight, an attempt at recovering the WBO world Strawweight championship, held this time by Ivan Calderón. On December 6, he lost to Calderón by a twelve-round unanimous decision at Bayamón.

On August 6, 2004, Sánchez, who had shortly before expressed to local newspapers that he hoped to become a world champion again, beat Roberto Gomez by an eight-round decision, as part of a San Juan undercard highlighted by José Miguel Cotto's win over former world champion Al Kotey.

Just over a month later, on September 11, he posted a first-round knockout over Arturo Velazquez, at the José Miguel Agrelot Coliseum, also in San Juan.

On January 29, 2005, Sánchez attempted to win the WBO world Jr. Flyweight title, but he lost to champion Nelson Dieppa of Vieques by an eleventh-round knockout. Puerto Rican boxing experts commented that the Sánchez-Dieppa fight should have been considered for "fight of the year" in Puerto Rico.

His next fight, once again for the WBO Jr. Lightweight title that Hugo Cazares had taken from Dieppa, was held in Ponce on August 20 of that year. After suffering an eye injury, Sánchez lost the fight by an eighth-round technical knockout, announcing his retirement from professional boxing immediately after the bout.

At a moment in his career Alex Sánchez was trained  by Félix Trinidad's father Felix Trinidad Sr.

Sánchez is now a boxing promoter in Puerto Rico.

Professional Record

Legacy
He is recognized at Ponce's Parque de los Ponceños Ilustres in the area of sports.

See also

List of Puerto Ricans
List of Puerto Rican boxing world champions

References

External links

1973 births
Living people
Mini-flyweight boxers
World mini-flyweight boxing champions
World Boxing Organization champions
Sportspeople from Ponce, Puerto Rico
Puerto Rican male boxers